Budapest Keleti (Eastern) station is the main international and inter-city railway terminal in Budapest, Hungary.

The station stands where Rákóczi út splits to become Kerepesi Avenue and Thököly Avenue. Keleti pályaudvar translates to Eastern Railway Terminus. Its name in 1891 originates not only for its position as the easternmost of the city's rail termini, but for its original role as a terminus of the lines from eastern Hungary including Transylvania, and the Balkans. In contrast, the Nyugati (western) railway station used to serve lines toward Vienna and Paris.

Architecture
The building was designed in eclectic style by Gyula Rochlitz and János Feketeházy and constructed between 1881 and 1884.  The main façade is adorned with two statues depicting James Watt and George Stephenson.  Inside the station are frescos by Karoly Lotz.

Train connections
The following trains call at this station:

I. International services:

Railjet trains
Bp-Keleti pu. – Győr – Vienna – St Pölten – Linz – Salzburg Hbf
Bp-Keleti pu. – Győr – Vienna – St Pölten – Linz – Salzburg – München Hbf - Stuttgart Hbf
Bp-Keleti pu. – Győr – Vienna – St Pölten – Linz – Salzburg – Innsbruck – Zürich HB
EuroCity trains – EC
(Lehar, Hortobágy, Semmelweis, Liszt Ferenc, Csárdás) Bp-Keleti pu. – Tatabánya – Győr – Wien 
EuroNight trains – EN
(Kálmán Imre) Bp-Keleti pu. – Győr – Vienna – St Pölten – Linz – Salzburg – München Hbf
(Metropol) Bp-Keleti pu. – Bratislava – Brno – Prague
Int. InterCity trains – IC
(Mura) Bp-Keleti pu. – Győr – Szombathely – Graz Hbf
(Drava) Bp-Keleti pu. – Győr – Szombathely – Graz - Maribor -  Ljubljana
(Hernád) Bp-Keleti pu. – Miskolc – Košice
(Transsylvania) Vienna - Győr - Bp-Keleti pu. – Szolnok – Békéscsaba – Arad – Deva – Sibiu – Brasov
(Ister) Bp-Keleti pu. – Szolnok – Békéscsaba – Arad – Deva – Sibiu – Brasov – București Nord
(Traianus, Muntenia) Bp-Keleti pu. - Szolnok - Békéscsaba - Arad - Timişoara - Drobeta Tr.Severin – Craiova – București Nord
(Körös) Bp-Keleti pu. - Szolnok - Békéscsaba - Arad
(Hargita) Bp-Keleti pu. – Szolnok – Püspökladány – Oradea – Cluj Napoca – Miercurea Ciuc – Brasov
(Fogaras) Bp-Keleti pu. – Szolnok – Békéscsaba – Arad – Deva – Sibiu – Brasov

Int. Express trains
(Dacia) Wien – Győr – Tatabánya – Bp-Keleti pu. – Szolnok – Békéscsaba – Arad – Deva – Brasov – București Nord

II. Inland

Intercity trains – IC

(Borostyánkő-Tűztorony, Claudius-Volt Fesztivál, Savaris-Scarbantia, Alpokalja-Kékfrankos, Répce-Sopron Bank)Bp-Keleti pu. – Kelenföld – Tatabánya – Győr – Csorna / Répcelak – Szombathely / Sopron
(Baranya, Dráva, Mecsek, PTE, Sopianae, Tenkes, Tettye, Tubes, Zengő)Bp-Keleti pu. – Kelenföld – Sárbogárd – Pincehely – Dombóvár – Sásd – Szentlőric – Pécs
(Abaúj, Borsod, Hámor, Lillafüred, Sajó, Szinva)Bp-Keleti pu. – Füzesabony – Miskolc-Tiszai
(Dália, Jázmin, Kamilla, Rózsa)Bp-Keleti pu. – Füzesabony – Miskolc-Tiszai – Szerencs – Tokaj – Nyíregyháza
(Tokaj, Tulipán)Bp-Keleti pu. – Füzesabony – Miskolc-Tiszai – Szerencs – Tokaj – Nyíregyháza – Debrecen
(Alföld, Békés, Csanád, Viharsarok)Bp-Keleti pu. – Szolnok – Mezőtúr – Gyoma – Mezőberény – Békéscsaba – Kétegyháza – Lőkösháza

Metro
Keleti pályaudvar metro station has been a station on the M2 (East-West) line of the Budapest Metro since the line opened in 1970. In March 2014, Line 4 opened making Keleti a transfer point between the two Metro lines.

Airport
A planned fast train service would connect the station with Budapest Liszt Ferenc International Airport. Since 36 of 53 Intercity services to Budapest operate from this railway station, it seems highly probable that this plan will materialize.

Baross tér redevelopment

The facade of Budapest Keleti faces onto a large three-sided plaza called Baross tér. In 2005, work began to construct a pedestrian concourse and exits to allow better access between the Keleti pályaudvar Station on Budapest Metro Line 4 and long-distance train facilities.  The statue of Gábor Baross, for whom the square is named, was returned to its location in December 2013 and work completed in March 2014.

Public transport
Budapest Keleti railway station is located in the eighth district of Budapest, Hungary.

Metro:   
Tram:  24
Trolleybus:  73, 76, 78, 79, 80, 80A
Bus:  5, 7, 7E, 8E, 20E, 30, 30A, 108E, 110, 112, 133E, 230
Nocturnal lines:  907, 908, 931, 956, 973, 990

Distance from other railway stations

Hungary
Tatabánya: 73 km
Győr: 140 km
Hegyeshalom  HU-AT: 187 km (to Vienna)
Pécs: 237 km
Hatvan: 67 km
Eger: 140 km
Miskolc: 182 km
Hidasnémeti  HU-SK: 244 km (to Košice)
Sátoraljaújhely: 266 km
Szolnok: 100 km
Békéscsaba: 196 km
Lőkösháza  HU-RO: 225 km (to Arad)

Europe
Berlin Hbf: 1026 km
București Nord: 854 km
Cluj-Napoca: 399 km
München Hbf: 740 km
Praha hl.n: 611 km
Timișoara Nord: 310 km
Wien Hbf: 254 km
Belgrade Centre: 350 km
Zagreb Glavni Kol.: 377 km
Zürich Hb: 1068 km

In popular culture
The station is featured in the opening sequence of the 2011 film, Mission: Impossible – Ghost Protocol.

The railway station appeared briefly in the 2021 Marvel Cinematic Universe film Black Widow.

Gallery

References

External links

  
Station Overview Map
A picture from about 1905
The façade
More photos: (1) , (2) , (3), (4)
Virtual tour outside station
Aerial photographs of the Station

Keleti
Railway stations opened in 1884
1884 establishments in Hungary